Krasnaya Polyana is a rural locality (a selo) in Tomsky Selsoviet of Seryshevsky District, Amur Oblast, Russia. The population was 154 as of 2018. There are 6 streets.

Geography 
Krasnaya Polyana is located 18 km south of Seryshevo (the district's administrative centre) by road. Ukraina is the nearest rural locality.

References 

Rural localities in Seryshevsky District